Break Loose, also known as Breaking Loose ( "figure eight", a nickname of the Lada Samara) is a 2013 Russian crime drama film directed by Alexei Uchitel. It was screened in the Contemporary World Cinema section at the 2013 Toronto International Film Festival.

In July 2014, in the context of the Donbass conflict, the state cinema agency of Ukraine has banned the film, along with number of other Russian films deemed to be "glorifying the Russian army and security forces".

Cast
 Artur Smolyaninov
 Vilma Kutaviciute
 Aleksey Mantsygin
 Alexander Novin
 Sergei Puskepalis

References

External links
 

2013 films
2010s Russian-language films
2013 action films
Films set in Moscow
Films shot in Moscow
2014 crime drama films
Russian crime drama films
Films directed by Alexei Uchitel